Skryabin, Skrjabin; Scriabine or Scriabin (Russian: Скрябин) is a Russian masculine surname, its feminine form is Skryabina or Scriabina. It may refer to:

 Alexander Scriabin (1872–1915), Russian composer and pianist
 Anastasiya Skryabina (born 1985), Ukrainian alpine skier 
 Ariadna Scriabina (1905–1944), Russian poet and activist of the French Resistance, daughter of Alexander 
 Constantin Scriabine (1878-1972), Russian helminthologist
 Vyacheslav Molotov, born Vyacheslav Skryabin, (1890-1986), Soviet politician and diplomat 
 Timofey Skryabin (born 1967), Soviet boxer 

Russian-language surnames